or , sometimes also known as Ryobu, is the Japanese god of the wind and one of the eldest Shinto gods. He is portrayed as a terrifying wizardly demon, resembling a red-headed green-skinned humanoid wearing a leopard skin, carrying a large bag of winds on his shoulders. In Japanese art, the deity is often depicted together with Raijin, the god of lightning, thunder and storms.

Myths

Birth 
According to Kojiki, Fūjin and his brother Raijin were born from Izanami after she died.

When Izanagi went down to Yomi to retrieve his wife, he saw her as a decaying corpse covered with demons. Izanagi rejected her, making Izanami furious, leading her and a few monsters to chase after Izanagi. Izanagi then blocked the entrance to Yomi. However, a few demons and oni escaped the underworld through a crack in the boulder, including Fūjin and his brother Raijin.

Depiction

The iconography of Fūjin seems to have its origin in the cultural exchanges along the Silk Road. Starting with the Hellenistic period when Greece occupied parts of Central Asia and India, the Greek wind god Boreas became the god Wardo/Oado in Bactrian Greco-Buddhist art, then a wind deity in China (as seen frescoes of the Tarim Basin; usually named Feng Bo/Feng Po - "Uncle Wind" - among various other names), and finally the Japanese Wind God Fūjin.  The wind god kept its symbol, the windbag, and its disheveled appearance throughout this evolution.

See also
 Vayu, Hindu god of wind
 Rudra, the Vedic wind or storm God
 Aeolus (Odyssey)

References

Bibliography

Notes 
  "The Japanese wind god images do not belong to a separate tradition apart from that of their Western counter-parts but share the same origins. ... One of the characteristics of these Far Eastern wind god images is the wind bag held by this god with both hands, the origin of which can be traced back to the shawl or mantle worn by Boreas/ Oado." (Katsumi Tanabe, "Alexander the Great, East-West cultural contacts from Greece to Japan", p21)

Japanese gods
Shinto kami
Wind deities